Patriarch Elias may refer to:

 Elias I of Jerusalem, Patriarch in 494–516
 Elias III of Jerusalem, Patriarch of Jerusalem from about 879 to 907
 Patriarch Elias I of Alexandria, Greek Patriarch of Alexandria in 963–1000
 Patriarch Elias II of Alexandria, Greek Patriarch of Alexandria in 1171–1175
 Elias Peter Hoayek, Maronite Patriarch in 1898–1931
 Ignatius Elias III, Syriac Orthodox Patriarch of Antioch in 1917–1932
 Elias IV of Antioch, Patriarch of the Greek Orthodox Church of Antioch in 1970–1979